Rebels with a Camera (French: Le direct avant la lettre) is a 2006 documentary film by Quebec director Denys Desjardins produced by the National Film Board of Canada (NFB). The title is a reference to the film Rebel Without a Cause

Synopsis
Where does cinéma vérité come from? Who were its predecessors and what did they create? Compelled by the urge to get closer to the people in front of the camera, cinema vérité sprouted in a context of unprecedented creative freedom. Avant-garde techniques and the pioneering filmmakers behind them, notably National Film Board of Canada icon Michel Brault, set the stage for a new movie-making philosophy born in the ‘50s and ‘60s, a philosophy whose influence lives on in virtually every facet of today's media.

Denys Desjardins recounts the story of a collective of rebel artists who revolutionized shooting and production methods within the backdrop of Quebec's Quiet Revolution. Interviews with forerunners Michel Brault, Roger Blais, Wolf Koenig, Denys Arcand, Marcel Carrière, Roman Kroitor, Terence Macartney-Filgate, Fernand Dansereau, Claude Fournier, Jean-Claude Labrecque, Jacques Giraldeau, and others, revisit a pivotal turning point in the evolution of modern film.

Award

 Awarded by the Quebec Film Critics Association for Best medium length Documentary of 2005.

External links
NFB Web page
 Michel Brault Box set
 

2006 films
Canadian documentary films
National Film Board of Canada documentaries
Films directed by Denys Desjardins
2006 documentary films
Documentary films about the cinema of Canada
Documentary films about film directors and producers
French-language Canadian films
2000s Canadian films